Science and Public Policy is a peer-reviewed scientific journal covering science policy. It was established in 1974 and is published ten times per year by Oxford University Press. The editors-in-chief are Sybille Hinze, Jeong-Dong Lee (Seoul National University), Nicholas Vonortas (George Washington University), and Caroline S. Wagner (Ohio State University). According to the Journal Citation Reports, the journal has a 2017 impact factor of 1.368.

References

External links

Policy analysis journals
Oxford University Press academic journals
Science policy
Publications established in 1974
English-language journals
10 times per year journals